Métisse (also known as Café au lait) is a 1993 French film directed by Mathieu Kassovitz.

Plot
Lola, a young West Indian Métis, is pregnant. However, she does not know which of her two lovers is the father: Felix, a poor Jewish bicycle courier, or Jamal, the son of affluent African diplomats. When she refuses to get a paternity test, the two men fight to prove to her that they would be a better father.

Cast
Julie Mauduech as Lola Mauduech
Hubert Koundé as Jamal Saddam Abossolo M'bo
Mathieu Kassovitz as Félix
Vincent Cassel as Max
Héloïse Rauth as Sarah
Andrée Damant as Maurice's mother
Peter Kassovitz as University professor

References

External links
 
 
 

1993 films
French romantic comedy films
Films directed by Mathieu Kassovitz
1990s French films